The  was the last battle before the Toyotomi main army's arrival on Kyūshū during Japan's Sengoku period.

In 1586 at Hetsugigawa (present Ōnogawa) in Bungo province Toyotomi's vanguard divisions under Chōsokabe Motochika and Sengoku Hidehisa landed on Kyūshū with orders to act defensively until further troops were able to join them. But the advance party decided to disobey Hideyoshi's commands and relieve the castle of Toshimitsu. The Shimazu besieging army noted their approach, and redoubled their efforts to take Toshimitsu castle, so that when the invaders arrived at the Hetsugi river, which flowed within sight of the castle, they could see the flags of Shimazu flying from its towers. 
Motochika proposed a withdrawal, but his companions, Yoshimune and Hidehisa, insisted on doing battle, so the Shimazu set their trap. 

The decoy force led by Ijuin Hisanori attacked across the river and then withdrew, which persuaded the allied left wing to follow them. They were met by arquebus and arrow fire, and the main body of the Shimazu under Iehisa and Tadamoto, then fell upon them. 
After much fierce fighting the invading force withdrew across the river and caused confusion to its own right wing. Chōsokabe Motochika was obliged to signal a full retreat, during which his son Nobuchika and Sogō Masayasu were killed.

References

Turnbull, Stephen (2012). Samurai Armies 1467-1649. Osprey Publishing.

1587 in Japan
Hetsugigawa
Hetsugigawa
Chōsokabe clan